St. Paul's Episcopal Church of East Cleveland is a current and historic church in East Cleveland, Ohio.  It was built in 1846, and it was listed on the U.S. National Register of Historic Places in 1984 under the 'churches' category. It is credited to the firm of Coburn, Barnum, & Benes.  The current occupants are a congregational church, the "Empowerment Church".

See also

 St. Paul's Episcopal Church

References

External links

Empowerment Church website

East Cleveland, Ohio
Churches on the National Register of Historic Places in Ohio
Historic American Buildings Survey in Ohio
Episcopal churches in Ohio
Churches in Cuyahoga County, Ohio
Gothic Revival church buildings in Ohio
National Register of Historic Places in Cuyahoga County, Ohio